Lapitch is the main character of:

The Brave Adventures of Lapitch, a 1913 novel by Ivana Brlić-Mažuranić
Lapitch the Little Shoemaker, a 1997 animated film based on that book
Lapitch the Little Shoemaker (TV series), a 2000 animated series